James Robert Henry Blake (6 October 1921 – 9 April 2010) was a sugarcane farmer and member of the Queensland Legislative Assembly.

Biography
Blake was born in Childers, Queensland, to parents Harold Joseph Blake and his wife Eva Lillian (née Pitt). He attended Doolbi Primary School, Childers Junior High School and Brisbane Technical College. Blake served in the 2d AIF in World War II, rising to the rank of Lance Bombardier with the 2/8 Field Regiment, 9 Division from 1941 until 1945 and on his return was a sugarcane farmer and trawlerman.

On 21 April 1951, he married Edna Mavis Berg and together they had four daughters. He died in Bundaberg in April 2010 and was buried in the Childers Lawn Cemetery.

Public career
When the Queensland Premier, Jack Pizzey, died in 1968, a by-election was held later in the year for his former seat of Isis in the Queensland Legislative Assembly. Blake, for the Labor Party, won the seat, which had always been held by the Country Party since its inception in 1932.
He held Isis until his defeat in the 1974 rout of the Labor Party.
 
Three years later, at the 1977 state elections, he won the seat of Bundaberg. He then remained its member until his retirement in 1983.

Blake was always on the opposition benches during his time in parliament and he held the following roles:
 Member of the Parliamentary Printing Committee 1969–1974
 Opposition spokesman for Primary Industries 1970–1974 and 1978–1982
 Member of the Parliamentary Delegation to Asia 1980
 Opposition Spokesman for Lands, Forestry and Water Resources 1977–1978
 Opposition Spokesman for Primary Industries and Fisheries 1982
 
His interests included community problems, music and sport, boating, fishing and skin-diving. He was an executive on the Isis District Canegrowers and a vice-patron of the TPI Association (Bundaberg branch). In 2001 Blake was awarded a Centenary Medal by the federal government for his service to parliament, politics and the community.

References

Members of the Queensland Legislative Assembly
1921 births
2010 deaths
Australian Labor Party members of the Parliament of Queensland
Australian Army personnel of World War II
Australian Army soldiers